Khorkhoruni was a region and a noble family of ancient and medieval Armenia c. 400–800.

The known rulers are:
Gadecho Khorkhoruni - Գադիշո Խորխոռունի (c. 445)
Khoren I Khorkhoruni - Խորեն Խորխոռունի (c. 450)
Gadich Khorkhoruni -  Գադիշ Խորխոռունի (c. 451)
Khoren II Khorkoruni c. 451
Gardchuyl Khorkhoruni c. 480
Atat Khorkhoruni c. 590
Thedoros Khorkhoruni c. 605
Vohan Khorkhoruni c. 640

See also
List of regions of old Armenia

Early medieval Armenian regions
Armenian noble families